Antonio Vivaldi composed three settings of the  (The Lord said [unto my Lord]), the Latin version of Psalm 110. They include a setting in ten movements for five soloists, double choir and orchestra, RV 594, another setting in eleven movements for five voices, five-part choir and orchestra, RV 595, and a recently discovered setting in eleven movements for five soloists, choir and orchestra, RV 807, which had been attributed to Baldassare Galuppi. It is said to be one of his "most significant sacred works."

History 
There are three recorded compositions of Dixit Dominus – Psalm 110 in Latin (or Psalm 109 in the Vulgate) – by Vivaldi. Each is an extended setting of the vespers psalm for five soloists, choir and orchestra; one only having been identified as his work in 2005.

Psalm 110 is regularly included in Vespers services, usually as the opening psalm. Dixit Dominus  has been said to be one of his "most significant sacred works".

RV 594 
Vivaldi's best-known setting, catalogued as RV 594, is structured in ten movements, eight psalm verses and two movements for the doxology. It is set for soloists, double choir and orchestra. Set in D major, it is scored for two sopranos, alto, tenor and bass soloists, two SATB choirs and orchestras. The duration is given as 25 minutes.

Carus-Verlag published a critical edition in 2005. The ten movements are:

 ,  D major, common time, double choirs, orchestras

RV 595 
The setting discovered next was catalogued as RV 595. Also in D major, it is structured in eleven movements, eight psalm verses and three movements for the doxology. It is scored for two sopranos, alto, tenor and bass soloists, a choir which also calls for divided soprano in some movements, and orchestra.

RV 807 
The Vivaldi setting catalogued as RV 807 was identified as his work only in 2005, having been thought to have been written by Baldassare Galuppi. A handwritten copy held by the Saxon State and University Library Dresden (Sächsische Staatsbibliothek) in Dresden is titled "Dixit a 4: con strumenti / del Sig: Baldasar Galuppi, detto Buranello / Fatto per l'Ospedale delli Mendicanti / 1745". Set in D-major, it  is scored for two sopranos, alto and two tenor soloists, choir and an orchestra of two bassoons, trumpet, strings and continuo. A reviewer of its first recording described it as a masterpiece with "bold, intensely coloured rhetoric".

References

Editions 
 Vivaldi: Dixit Dominus, RV 594, Carus-Verlag 2005

External links
 
 
 David Vickers: Vivaldi Dixit Dominus Gramophone 2009
 Dixit Dominus, RV594 Hyperion Records
 Dixit Dominus, RV595 Hyperion Records

Compositions by Antonio Vivaldi
Psalm settings